Do Gerdan Khunsorkh (also Romanized as Do Gerdān Khūnsorkh; also known as Do Gerdān, Dogerdān, and Dowgerdān) is a village in Gachin Rural District, in the Central District of Bandar Abbas County, Hormozgan Province, Iran. At the 2006 census, its population was 1,581, in 337 families.

References 

Populated places in Bandar Abbas County